The 1957 Singapore Open, also known as the 1957 Singapore Open Badminton Championships, took place from 2 October – 4 December 1957 at the Singapore Badminton Hall in Singapore. The ties were played over a few months with the first round ties being played on the 2nd of October and the finals on the 4th of December. The mixed doubles final was played on the 16th of November.

This was also the very first championships whereby the tournament was open to competitors from both in and outside Singapore.

Venue
Singapore Badminton Hall

Final results

References 

Singapore Open (badminton)
1957 in badminton